Jeff Geddis (born June 28, 1975) is a Canadian film and television actor, best known for his roles in Sophie and The Latest Buzz. He also played Mike Nesmith in the 2000 TV movie Daydream Believers: The Monkees' Story. He also voiced Reef in the FreshTV series Stoked.

He voiced the characters Devin (25 episodes) and Tom (8 episodes) on Total Drama Presents: The Ridonculous Race in 2015.

Filmography

Film

Television

External links
 

1975 births
Living people
Canadian male film actors
Canadian male television actors
Canadian male voice actors
People from Thunder Bay
Male actors from Ontario